MSC Carmen is a container ship built in 2008 by the Daewoo Mangalia Heavy Industries in Mangalia, Romania and currently operated by Mediterranean Shipping Company S.A. She is the seventh ship delivered to the Swiss company in a series of 12 ordered.
The  ship has a container capacity of 4,860 TEU's.

References

External links
MSC Carmen

Container ships
Ships built in Romania
2007 ships